Mont Yamaska (in English, Mount Yamaska) (in Abenaki, Wigwômadenek) is part of the Monteregian Hills in southern Quebec. This mountain is largely covered with deciduous forest dominated by sugar maple. Some apple orchards are raised on lower slopes.

Geology
Mont Yamaska is composed of igneous rock and hornfels. The igneous rock is mostly mafic with much gabbro, essexite, and a titanium-rich pyroxenite. There also is a small area of nepheline syenite. Mont Yamaska might be the deep extension of a vastly eroded ancient volcanic complex, which was probably active about 125 million years ago. The mountain was created when the North American Plate moved westward over the New England hotspot, along with the other mountains of the Monteregian Hills that form part of the Great Meteor hotspot track.

See also
Yamaska National Park

References

External links

 Le mont Yamaska «sous mon aile!»
 Fondation pour la conservation du mont Yamaska

Mont Yamaska
Mountains of Quebec under 1000 metres
Igneous petrology of Quebec
Stocks (geology)